Elmo is an unincorporated community located in the town of Smelser, Grant County, Wisconsin, United States.

History
A post office called Elmo was established in 1875, and remained in operation until it was discontinued in 1924. The community was named after the 1866 novel St. Elmo by Augusta Jane Evans.

Notes

Unincorporated communities in Grant County, Wisconsin
Unincorporated communities in Wisconsin